August Christian Valdemar Hassel (9 February 1864 – 30 May 1942) was a Danish sculptor.

Early life and education
Hassel was born in Copenhagen, the son of captain and mechanic Johan Fridolin Hassel and Doris Henriette Eickhoff.
He apprenticed under stucco artist and carver H.C. Berg from August 1879 and graduated from Copenhagen Technical College in January 1882. He graduated from the School of Decorative Arts on 25 May 1886. He later continued his training at the Royal Danish Academy of Fine Arts where he studied under Theobald Stein, graduating on 30 January 1888.

Career
Hassel had his debut at the Charlottenborg Spring Exhibition in 1888 with a portrait bust of composer Niels Gade. It was later followed by a number of other portraits. Most of his work was within the area of religious art and he contributed with sculptural works and altarpieces for a number of churches.

List of works
 Niels Gade (1889)
 Memorial to Christian IX  (1908) Frederiksberg (with Ludvig Knudsen)
 Crucifix (1900)  Fredens Church, Copenhagen 
 Memorial to Christian IX (1912) Tirsbjerg 
 Bust of Peter Christian Abildgaard (1910)  Landbohøjsk 
 Bust of Frederik VIII (1819)
 Bust of Queen Louise, dowager queen of Denmark (1913)
 Hans Egede and Gertrud Rask  (1921) St. Nicolas' Church, Copenhagen
 Bernhard Bang (1923) University of Copenhagen Frederiksberg Campus 
 Crown Prince Frederik and Crown Princess Louise Foundation (1901) Nr. 59 Sortedam Dossering, Copenhagen 
 Kristi gravlæggelse (1890)
 Syge anråber Jesus om hjælp (1891) Garnisons Sogns Menighedshus, Copenhagen 
 Jesus opvækker Lazarus (1897)  Nørre Broby Church 
 Jesus prædiker i Nazareth (1904)  formerly Nazareth Church, Copenhagen 
 Lazarus opvækkelse (1918) Grøndalskirke, Copenhagen

Gallery

References

External links

 August Hassel at Kunstindeks Danmark

19th-century Danish sculptors
20th-century Danish sculptors
Male sculptors
Artists from Copenhagen
1864 births
1942 deaths
Royal Danish Academy of Fine Arts alumni
Danish male artists
19th-century Danish male artists
20th-century Danish male artists